Barua Sagar Tal is a large lake situated in Barua Sagar near Jhansi in the Indian state of Uttar Pradesh.

History
It is a large lake created about 260 years ago by Raja Udit Singh of Orchha, who built the embankment.
According to reports in media, the dam is claimed to be built around 1694 A.D. 
The beautiful temple Jarai-ka-Math, and the historic forts of Bundelkhand are nearby attractions.

References

External links
India.bizhat.com
Mustseeindia.com
Jhansi.nic.in

Jhansi
Tourism in Jhansi
Lakes of Uttar Pradesh
Tourist attractions in Jhansi district
Water Heritage Sites in India